Prince Umberto may refer to:

 Umberto I of Italy (1844-1900), formerly Prince of Piedmont
 Prince Umberto, Count of Salemi (1889-1918) 
 Umberto II of Italy (1904-1983), formerly Prince of Piedmont